The 13 Ghosts of Scooby-Doo is an American animated television series produced by Hanna-Barbera Productions, and the seventh incarnation of the studio's Scooby-Doo franchise. Thirteen episodes of the show were made in 1985. It replaced Scary Scooby Funnies, a repackaging of earlier shows; another repackaged series, Scooby's Mystery Funhouse, followed.

The series also aired in reruns on USA Network in the 1990s, on Cartoon Network, and from time to time on Cartoon Network's sister channel Boomerang until 2014. With 13 episodes, it is currently the shortest-running series in the Scooby-Doo franchise to date. A follow-up film, Scooby-Doo! and the Curse of the 13th Ghost, released in 2019, featured the previously unseen 13th ghost and ended the series. Additionally, the entire series is accessible via the streaming services Boomerang and Tubi.

Plot

In the initial episode, the gang are thrown off course on a trip to Honolulu in Daphne's plane, landing instead in Himalayas. While inside a temple, Scooby and Shaggy are tricked by two bumbling ghosts named Weerd and Bogel into opening the Chest of Demons, a magical artifact that houses the 13 most terrifying and powerful ghosts and demons ever to walk the face of the Earth. As the ghosts can only be returned to the chest by those who originally set them free, Scooby and Shaggy, accompanied by Daphne, Scrappy-Doo, and a young con artist named Flim Flam, embark on a worldwide quest to recapture them before they wreak irreversible havoc upon the world.

Assisting them is Flim Flam's friend, a warlock named Vincent Van Ghoul (based upon and voiced by Vincent Price), who contacts the gang using his crystal ball and often employs magic and witchcraft to assist them. The 13 escaped ghosts, meanwhile, each attempt to do away with the gang lest they are returned to the chest, often employing Weerd and Bogel as lackeys.

Fred Jones and Velma Dinkley were both absent in this incarnation. In Scooby-Doo! and the Curse of the 13th Ghost, it is revealed that they were away at summer camp.

Production
The series was created and produced by Mitch Schauer. Tom Ruegger was associate producer and story editor, the irreverent, fourth wall-breaking humor found in each episode resurfaced in his later works, among them  A Pup Named Scooby-Doo, Tiny Toon Adventures, and Animaniacs. Of The 13 Ghosts of Scooby-Doo, Ruegger recalls not being fond of the Flim-Flam character or the other added characters in the cast. As with most of the other early-1980s Scooby-Doo entries, original characters Fred Jones and Velma Dinkley do not appear, and the enemies were real (within the context of the series) ghosts and not simply humans in costume. 13 Ghosts ended its run after 13 episodes and was replaced by reruns of Laff-a-Lympics in March 1986, before the end of the season.

After a hiatus, Ruegger and ABC decided that they would overhaul the series entirely, developing A Pup Named Scooby-Doo in 1988. At the time of the cancellation, twelve of the thirteen ghosts were recaptured in the chest of demons with the show stopping production before the last ghost could be found. Originally it was debatable if Captain Ferguson, the antagonist of the episode "Ship of Ghouls", counted as one of the thirteen ghosts. However it was later confirmed by Curse of the 13th Ghost writer Tim Sheridan that Captain Ferguson was one of the thirteen. To date, it is the last Scooby-Doo running series to have featured Scrappy-Doo, who was removed as a regular character after the three Hanna-Barbera Superstars 10 movies in 1987-8.

A direct-to-video film released in 2019, Scooby-Doo! and the Curse of the 13th Ghost, resolves the open ending of the original and features the entire gang helping Vincent Van Ghoul in capturing the last ghost.

Voice cast

 Don Messick – Scooby-Doo and Scrappy-Doo
 Casey Kasem – Shaggy
 Heather North – Daphne Blake
 Susan Blu – Flim-Flam
 Arte Johnson – Weerd
 Howard Morris – Bogel
 Vincent Price – Vincent Van Ghoul

Episodes

Home media
On June 29, 2010, Warner Home Video (via Hanna-Barbera and Warner Bros. Family Entertainment) released The 13 Ghosts of Scooby-Doo: The Complete Series on DVD in Region 1.

Reception

The series was heavily profiled in the Christian fundamentalist documentary Deception of a Generation as an example of occult influences on children's entertainment.

Follow-up film
35 years after the series end a follow-up film called Scooby-Doo! and the Curse of the 13th Ghost was released in order to tie-up the loose end that revolved around the 13th Ghost, Asmodeus.

See also
 Scooby-Doo! and the Curse of the 13th Ghost
 Scooby-Doo (character)
 List of works produced by Hanna-Barbera Productions
 List of Hanna-Barbera characters
 List of Scooby-Doo characters

References

External links
 Official Scooby-Doo website
 
 The Big Cartoon Database – The 13 Ghosts of Scooby-Doo
 The Cartoon Scrapbook – Profile on The 13 Ghosts of Scooby-Doo

1985 American television series debuts
1985 American television series endings
1980s American animated television series
1980s American horror television series
Scooby-Doo television series
American Broadcasting Company original programming
American animated television spin-offs
American children's animated adventure television series
American children's animated comedy television series
American children's animated fantasy television series
American children's animated horror television series
American children's animated mystery television series
American children's animated supernatural television series
Animated television series about ghosts
English-language television shows
Television series by Hanna-Barbera
Television series created by Tom Ruegger
Television series created by Joe Ruby
Television series created by Ken Spears
Television series created by Mitch Schauer